The New Machine of Liechtenstein is the third album by Holy Moses, released in 1989 on WEA. It was re-released on 5 August 2005 through Armageddon and then in 2007 by Locomotive with 2 bonus live tracks.

All music composed and arranged by Andy Classen and Uli Kusch.
Lyrics by Sabina Classen and Andy Classen.

Track listing 
 "Near Dark" - 5:31
 "Defcon II" - 4:10
 "Panic" - 3:05
 "Strange Deception" - 4:18
 "Locky Popster" - 3:39
 "SSP (Secret Service Project)" - 3:15
 "State: Catatonic" - 3:51
 "The Brood" - 2:50
 "Lost in the Maze" - 5:16

Reissue bonus tracks 
 "SSP" (live in Bad Salzungen/Kallewerk 14 May 2005 at Wacken Roadshow)
 "Lost in the Maze" (live at Rock Harz Festival Osterode, 9 July 2005)

Personnel 
 Sabina Classen - vocals
 Andy Classen - guitar
 Tom Becker - bass
 Uli Kusch - drums

1989 albums
Holy Moses albums
Warner Music Group albums
Albums produced by Alex Perialas